Tibor Flórián (4 February 1938 – 28 February 2008) was a Hungarian volleyball player. He competed in the men's tournament at the 1964 Summer Olympics.

References

1938 births
2008 deaths
Hungarian men's volleyball players
Olympic volleyball players of Hungary
Volleyball players at the 1964 Summer Olympics
Volleyball players from Budapest